Edward Janney is an American musician, producer and artist who has played guitar for many Washington, D.C.-based hardcore punk bands such as Untouchables, The Faith, Rites of Spring, One Last Wish, Happy Go Licky, Skewbald/Grand Union and Brief Weeds, as well as having produced albums for Scream and Embrace and created album covers for Funeral Oration, Monorchid, Rites of Spring and Happy Go Licky.

Discography

As a musician
Studio albums

EPs

Compilations

Guest appearances

As a producer

References

American punk rock guitarists
American record producers
Hardcore punk musicians
Rites of Spring members
The Faith (American band) members
One Last Wish members
Skewbald/Grand Union members
Untouchables (punk band) members